The Joint Forces Headquarters (Abbr.: JFHQ, Jawi: مركس اڠكتن برسام) is a joint military command which specifically formed to command all tasks of the Malaysian Armed Forces joint operations. The Joint Operations are other operations performed by at least three services such as Malaysian Army, Royal Malaysian Navy and the Royal Malaysian Air Force.

The JFHQ which currently led by Lieutenant General Dato’ Haji Yazid bin Haji Arshad  as the Joint Force Commander is responsible for planning and implementing all the joint and combined operations, joint exercises and Multi-National Operations, such as the United Nations (UN) peacekeeping missions. The JFHQ as like any other joint forces adopts the assigned concept.

History

Establishment of JFHQ

The history of the JFHQ began when the proposal for its establishment was approved on 20 April 2004.
JFHQ was launched by Najib Razak, the then-Deputy Prime Minister cum Minister of Defence, on 6 September 2004 and is designed to meet the needs of the establishment of a Joint Force Headquarters. At that time, the Chief of Staff of Malaysian Armed Forces Headquarters, Vice Admiral Dato’ Ramlan Mohamed Ali, was appointed as the JFHQ Commander from 6 September 2004 on an ad hoc basis.
The Chief of MAF Staff, Lieutenant General Datuk Hj Shahron Hj Ibrahim RMAF then appointed the JFHQ Commander post effectively from 1 December 2006.

After the JFHQ organisation was officially established, Major General Dato' Allatif Mohd Noor took over the command of the JFHQ. With a total strength of 312 officers and personnel, this command has been carrying out the tasks entrusted by the Jointness concept which is three services is designed to perform its functions more effectively in assisting the Chief of Defence Forces in terms of governance and control operations at the highest levels of Malaysian Armed Forces (MAF).

The JFHQ serves as the operational level of command responsible for planning and implementing all the joint operation, which is likely to be a potentially joint, the combined operation and such multinational security operations under the charter of the Organisation of the United Nations (UN). In addition, the headquarters is also responsible for implementing all the Joint Training/Exercise. Other than managing current operations, JFHQ is also responsible to give input on the preparation for future capability development. In fulfilling that need, one current challenge that has to be taken into account is a budgetary constraint. For that, JFHQ is focused on the concept of “fit for the purpose” or enabling a capability that fulfils the true requirement as well as a balanced capability development that also takes into account the aspect of interoperability. This is to make sure that any capability developed in the future contribute to the effective execution of the operation and the limited budget can be spent in the most optimal manner.

Other than managing current operations, JFHQ is also responsible to give input on the preparation for future capability development. In fulfilling that need, one current challenge that has to be taken into account is a budgetary constraint. For that, JFHQ is focused on the concept of “fit for the purpose” or enabling a capability that fulfils the true requirement as well as a balanced capability development that also takes into account the aspect of interoperability. This is to make sure that any capability developed in the future contribute to the effective execution of the operation and the limited budget can be spent in the most optimal manner.

Timeline 
20 April 2004 – Its establishment was approved by the Malaysian Armed Forces Council during the council's 340th meeting.

6 September 2004 – The JFHQ was launched by the Deputy Prime Minister cum Minister of Defence, Najib Razak.

16 July 2007 – Officially established after has been approved by the Public Service Department.

19 July 2012 – The JFHQ has been recognised by the UN.

25 June 2019 – The HQ for JFHQ was relocated from the Wisma Pertahanan, Kuala Lumpur to a newly built  facility, the JFHQ Complex, located at Sungai Panching Camp in Kuantan, Pahang.

Roles
The role of JFHQ as an Operational Level Command is responsible for planning and executing all the Joint Operation, which is likely to be a potentially joint operation, the combined operation, integrated operations and multinationals such as operations under the UN Charter.

Functions
 As an Operational Headquarters is responsible for command, control and manage Assigned Forces to undertake of the Joint/Combined operations.
 Plan and implement integration forces exercises for assigned forces for the purpose of Joint/Combined operating.
 Establish Situational Awareness for Joint/Combined operations.
 Formulate and update the doctrine and the Standing Operation Procedure (SOP) of Joint Warfare.
 Planning and implementation of all the Joint Bilateral and multilateral levels.
 Deployed and administered all military personnel who perform duties under the charter of the Association of the United Nations (UN).

Organizational structure 
The JFHQ is led by Joint Forces Commander and supported by Joint Forces Chief-of-Staff. Under them, there is eight main divisions.

Joint Force Commander 
Also known as the Chief of Joint Forces, and Panglima Angkatan Bersama (PAB) in the Malay Language, the PAB is in charge of the entire forces and directly report to the minister of defence and Chief of Defence Forces. The PAB is a three-star rank selected between all three branches of Malaysian Armed Forces (MAF).

Joint Force Chief-of-Staff 
Known as Ketua Staf Angkatan Bersama (KS MK AB) in the Malay Language, the KS MK AB is a two-star rank selected between all three branches of MAF.

J1 – Human Resources Division 
This division is tasked to manage the joint force personnel, the members' distribution and management in terms of individual aspects including discipline, morale, welfare, religion and legislation in a time of war or peace for the 'assigned forces' attached to the Joint Forces Command. The J1 is led by a senior officer with the rank of Colonel for the army and air forces or Captain for the navy.

The division is in charge of three departments:

 Human Resources Department
 Religious Service Department
 Legislation Department

J2 – Intelligence Division 
This division is tasked to perform intelligence operations in time of peace and war, and to invent or create products used for intelligence activities in order to satisfy the Joint Force needs. This division is responsible to regularly report the daily intelligence to the Defence Operation Centre. Led by a senior officer with the rank of Colonel or its navy equivalent, this division is also tasked to conduct talks about intelligence awareness and performing physical patrol in sensitive Joint Force premises to avoid any possible leakage.

The J2 is responsible to perform intelligence exchange between foreign intelligence agencies and also other Malaysian government agencies. The J2 is a part of Sabah multiple government agencies joint intelligence – the Joint Intelligence Working Group (JIWG).

The division is in charge of these departments:

 Regional Intelligence Cell/International Intelligence Unit
 Domestic Intelligence Cell
Counter-intelligence/Security Cell
Psychological Warfare Cell

J3 – Joint Operation Division 
One of the largest division in the JFHQ. This division is led by a two-star rank and assisted by a one-star rank. The J3 is composed of four cells:

Cell A – Domestic Operations 
In charge of monitoring all Malaysian Armed Forces (MAF) domestic, joint, combined and integrated operations. This cell also monitors all standalone operations conducted by any branches of MAF.

Cell B – Global Operations 
In charge of making the assessment for MAF involvements in United Nations (UN) Peacekeeping Operations in terms of UN Military Observer, UN Battalion, UN HQ Staff and UN Technical Staff.

This cell offering to any MAF personnel to be a Military Observer Officer, or as a Liaison Officer in the United Nations Department of Peacekeeping Operations (UNDPKO) in New York, or any operations by the UN.

Joint Exercise Department 

In charge of conducting any joint and combined exercise between the Malaysian Armed Forces and foreign military forces. This cell is responsible for planning, coordinate and adjust all Exercise Planning Meetings and act as a secretariat to the joint and combined exercise.

Cell D – Special Forces Operations 
In charge of planning, coordinate, execute and monitor all special operations involving two or more branches of the MAF. Cell D also in charge of uniting and coordinating all MAF needs in special operations.

J4 – Logistic Support Division 
This division is led by a one-star rank. The J4 is composed of four departments:

Logistic Planning Department

In charge of providing logistic supports for joint/combined operation and exercise within the country or overseas between the MAF and foreign military forces.

Materials Support Department

In charge of providing and coordinate in terms of logistic support aspects of the joint/combined forces. This department also acts as a coordinator in supplying logistic demands to the 'assigned forces' that involved in joint/combined operations and exercise in terms of raise, train and maintain their personnel.

Transportation Department

In charge of planning and managing transportation and mobility sources for joint/combined operations and exercise that involves JFHQ either from the MAF, private or foreign source. This department also tasked as coordinator for all types of transportation either air, land or sea for joint, combined and multinational operations/exercises within the country or overseas.

Financial Department

In charge of obtaining the budget and processing all financial requirements involving the operations/exercise or any related activities such as an allowance for the MAF personnel on duty under the UN.

J5 – Planning/Coordination Division 
In charge of drafting the policies involves joint military operations. The J5 also tasked with formulating MAF defence contingency plans at the operational stage that involves all three branches of MAF, Malaysian government agencies and foreign agencies. The J5 is led by a two-star rank and composed of two departments:

 Department of Planning
 Department of Development

J6 – Joint Communication and Electronics Division 
In charge of supplying the communications for all MAF operations. The J6 also tasked to coordinate the needs of Electronics and Cyber Warfare. The J6 is led by a one-star rank.

J7 – Joint Exercise Division 

In charge of handling and execute the large scale joint exercise between all three branches of MAF and large scale combined exercise between the MAF and military of friendly nations. Led by a one-star rank, the J7 is composed of two cells:

Joint Exercise Cell
 Combined Exercise Cell

J9 – Military Health Division 
In charge of monitoring and coordinate health affairs for the Ops Pasir and other MAF overseas missions.

Field Training Exercises 
Some of the exercises handled and executed by the JFHQ's J7 including:

Aman Youyi 
The Exercise Aman Youyi is a bilateral military exercise between the MAF and the Chinese People Liberation Army. It is held annually since 2014. In Aman Youyi 2018, the Royal Thai Armed Forces take part in the exercise.

Bersama Shield 
The Exercise Bersama Shield is a multilateral military exercise between the five countries of Five Power Defence Arrangements, which are Australia, Malaysia, New Zealand, Singapore and United Kingdom. It is held annually in Malaysia and Singapore.

Bersama Warrior 
The Exercise Bersama Warrior is an annual joint bilateral exercise between the countries of Malaysia and the United States designed to develop and improve their collective capacity to plan and conduct joint and combined operations. It is focused on Non–Combatant Evacuation Operation (NEO), Personnel Recovery (PR), Counter-Terrorism (CT), Maritime Security and Humanitarian Support Operation.

CARAT Malaysia 

The Cooperation Afloat Readiness and Training, known as Exercise CARAT, is a series of annual bilateral military exercises conducted by the United States Pacific Fleet with several member nations of ASEAN in Southeast Asia. The MAF has been part of Exercise CARAT since 1995.

The CARAT hosted by Malaysia is known as CARAT Malaysia and it is focused on strengthening the capabilities of the Royal Malaysian Navy (RMN) and MAF maritime assets and also the partnership between the RMN, U.S. Navy and U.S. Marines.

Cobra Gold 

The Exercise Cobra Gold is the largest military exercise in the Asia-Pacific region, hosted by the Royal Thai Armed Forces and the United States Indo-Pacific Command. It is held annually in Thailand and involves seven nations including Malaysia.

Joint Combined Exercise Thailand Malaysia 
The Joint Combined Exercise Thailand Malaysia, known as JCEX THAMAL, is a bilateral military exercise between the countries of Malaysia and Thailand. It is focused on operations during a natural disaster and involves disaster relief NGOs and teams such as the SMART. It is held in northern Malaysia.

Malindo Darsasa 
The Latihan Gabungan Bersama Darat Samudera Angkasa Malaysia-Indonesia, known with its acronym Latgabma Malindo Darsasa, is a bilateral military exercise between the countries of Malaysia and Indonesia. It is focused on the corporation between the two nation's military if a disaster (war or natural) happened. It is held once every three years.

Tiger Strike 
The Exercise Tiger Strike is a bilateral military exercise between the countries of Malaysia and the United States and focused on amphibious operations. It is used to familiarise the 7th and 22nd Battalion, Royal Malay Regiment in amphibious landing, and improve communication and coordination during amphibious operations. It is to prepare the battalions with marine infantry roles and also be attached to the U.S. Marine Corps if needed to. The battalions are assisted by the Royal Malaysian Air Force and special operations element from the RMN PASKAL.

Operations

Operation Pasir
On the local operation, JFHQ is responsible for the implementation Operations of Pandanan And Sipadan Island Resort or popularly known by Operation PASIR. This operation is a joint operation involving the assets of the three services in the East Sabah area under the command of Joint Task Force 2 Commander.

Operation PASIR area covers the whole east coast of Sabah from Kudat to Semporna which includes the Malaysian Exclusive Economic Zone waters and Sabah airspace bordering the South China Sea to the Sulu Sea and the Sulawesi Sea at the east. The main mission of Operation PASIR is to create a safe and secure environment in the East Coast of Sabah to protect national sovereignty and create conditions conducive to economic activity.

Operation Daratan
Operation Daratan is almost similar with Operation Pasir. Both operations are conducted at East Coast Sabah, however, as its name suggests, Operation Daratan is more towards the inland. Additional two battalions are stationed at East Sabah under the Operation Daratan, and together with the Operation Pasir, a total of five battalions are stationed there. Three of the five battalions is special operations battalions.

Overseas Operations
On the overseas operations, the presence of the MAF increasingly felt by the world community. Involvement of military personnel in the mission of the UN has raised the image of the MAF in particular and the country in general through the ability, the dedication, commitment and high discipline of MAF members during their assignment.

Among the foreign missions being undertaken by the MAF such as:
 United Nations Interim Force in Lebanon (UNIFIL)
 Operation of Interim National Support and Assistance to Afghanistan (Op INSAF)
 International Monitoring Team – Mindanao

List of Joint Force Commanders
Temporary Commanders

Commanders

See also
 Ministry of Defence Malaysia
 CANSOFCOM
 INSFOC
 United States Special Operations Command (USSOCOM)

References

External links

Military of Malaysia
Military units and formations established in 2004
Ministry of Defence (Malaysia)
Joint service commands (military formations)